Mathew John Mitchel-King (born 12 September 1983) is an English semi-professional footballer who plays as a defender for Hayes & Yeading United. He can also play as a midfielder.

Club career

Histon
Mitchel-King was born in Reading, Berkshire. While at Histon, Mitchel-King was a part-time body double of Rio Ferdinand for the Nike adverts. He gave this up when he signed a two-year full-time contract with Crewe Alexandra.

Crewe Alexandra
Mitchel-King joined Crewe Alexandra on 29 June 2009, on a free transfer after rejecting a new deal with Histon. He made his league debut in Crewe's opening day defeat to Dagenham & Redbridge. He was released from the club in May 2011.

AFC Wimbledon
On 24 June 2011, newly promoted League Two side AFC Wimbledon announced the signing of Mitchel-King after his release from Crewe Alexandra. However, the start of his season was hampered by an injury which kept him sidelined for the first twelve games of the season. He made his first team debut in a London Senior Cup tie against Wingate & Finchley on 29 November 2011. He was released by AFC Wimbledon with nine other players on 14 May 2013.

Dartford
Following his release from AFC Wimbledon, Mitchel-King joined Conference side Dartford on 9 August 2013. He made his debut on 10 August 2013 in a 1–0 win over Alfreton Town. On 29 January 2015, he left Dartford following the expiration of his contract and long-term work commitments.

St. Neots Town
In January 2015, following his release from Dartford, he signed for Southern Football League Premier Division side St Neots Town on a free transfer.

Hemel Hempstead Town
Mitchel-King left St Neots Town to join National League South side Hemel Hempstead Town in early 2016, but left after the conclusion of the 2015–16 season.

Chesham United
He then joined Chesham United.

Career statistics

References

External links

1983 births
Living people
Sportspeople from Reading, Berkshire
English footballers
AFC Wimbledon players
Cambridge City F.C. players
Chesham United F.C. players
Crewe Alexandra F.C. players
Dartford F.C. players
Hayes & Yeading United F.C. players
Hemel Hempstead Town F.C. players
Histon F.C. players
Mildenhall Town F.C. players
St Neots Town F.C. players
English Football League players
National League (English football) players
Southern Football League players
English male models
Association football defenders
Association football midfielders
Footballers from Berkshire